Globe Theatre, Boston may refer to:

 Globe Theatre, Boston (1871), Boston, Massachusetts
 Globe Theatre, Boston (1903), Boston, Massachusetts